The 1988 PBA Open Conference Finals was the best-of-7 series basketball championship of the 1988 PBA Open Conference, and the conclusion of the conference playoffs. The San Miguel Beermen and Purefoods Hotdogs, aiming for a cinderella finish, played for the 39th championship contested by the league.

The San Miguel Beermen repeated as back-to-back champions, denying the Purefoods Hotdogs a first title in its maiden season in the PBA, the Beermen won in a seven-game series by taking the last two games. The best-of-seven finals went the full distance for only the second time in league history.

Qualification

Series scoring summary

Games summary

Game 1

San Miguel took advantage of the Hotdogs' sluggish start and led 27–11 early, the Beermen padded their margin to 23 points at 51–28 in the second quarter and took a 62–47 lead at halftime. Purefoods could only come closer to six points, 80–86, barely a minute into the fourth period.

Game 2

After allowing the Beermen to score lots of points in the series opener, the Hotdogs put up a tough, defensive stand to limit San Miguel's output. Purefoods led by 18 points at 72–54 in the third quarter but the Beermen reduced their lead to just two in the final period, David Thirdkill came to the rescue and score seven of the Hotdogs' last nine points to seal the victory.

Game 3

Rookie Jojo Lastimosa put on a show as he led Purefoods to a 22–4 blitz that turn an 84–74 San Miguel lead to a 96–88 Purefoods win. Back-to-back triples by Lastimosa and Al Solis pushed the Hotdogs to within four, 80–84. The Beermen were ahead by three points, 88–85, when Purefoods called a timeout and eleven unanswered points by the Hotdogs followed with Lastimosa's three-point play gave them the lead for good at 90–88.

Game 4

San Miguel led by 17 points early in the third quarter. But down the stretch was another Purefoods comeback. A three-point play by Jojo Lastimosa tied the count at 84-all. Elmer Reyes sent the Beermen back on top with a lay-up, successive hits by Lastimosa and Jerry Codinera put the Hotdogs out front, 88–86, with just a little over two minutes left in the fourth period. David Thirdkill was saddled with five fouls and had only scored 18 points. San Miguel got a lift on the next play as Abet Guidaben knocked in a 12-footer and drew a foul from Ramon Fernandez. Abet made the free throw for a one-point lead by San Miguel, 89–88. On the next play, Thirdkill muffed a jumper, Guidaben came back with another basket to give the Beermen a three-point margin, 91–88. Again, Purefoods went to Thirdkill for the hit and he failed. With the time down to eight seconds, Hector Calma drove in and got a foul from Al Solis, he converted both of his free throws for a finishing 7–0 run as San Miguel level the series at two games apiece. Playing coach Norman Black outscored Thirdkill, 20–18, for the second time in the playoffs. The Beermen were unable to field Ricardo Brown, who had to sit out the game on his physician's orders.

Game 5

Veterans Ramon Fernandez and Abet Guidaben got into several ugly plays early, the Hotdogs were on top by 16 points, 80–64, after three quarters. The Beermen threatened twice in the final period, the last at 94–95 when Jojo Lastimosa banged in a three-point shot and on the next play, Lastimosa sink both his charities to give Purefoods a six-point edge, 100–94.

Game 6

After a 42-all standoff at halftime, the Beermen outscored the Hotdogs by 17 points in the third quarter for a 77–60 advantage going into the last 12 minutes of play. Purefoods' Al Solis tried to keep the Hotdogs into the thick of the fight with booming triples, including three straight midway in the fourth quarter, San Miguel answered every baskets Purefoods made to force a decisive seventh game.

Game 7

Before a capacity crowd of more than 12,000 at the ULTRA in the deciding Game 7, San Miguel open the third quarter with six straight points to take the biggest lead for the night at 53–44. The Hotdogs on the heroics of Al Solis keeps coming back, Purefoods last tasted the lead, 73–71, early in the fourth period, an 8–0 blast by the Beermen gave them a six-point edge, 79–73. With the score standing at 88–80 for San Miguel, Al Solis drained his fifth triple that started an 8–2 run for the Hotdogs and trimmed the deficit to two points, 88–90, with only 11 seconds remaining. Purefoods playing coach Ramon Fernandez was called for his sixth and final foul off Ricardo Brown, San Miguel leading, 92–90. Brown converted his two charities to give the Beermen a four-point edge, 94–90.

Showing championship composure all night long, San Miguel eked out a 94–92 win in the seventh and final game of the series. Abet Guidaben had a truly big seventh game with 28 points, Norman Black came up with 38 points and held Purefoods import David Thirdkill to a measly 16 points in the final game, the lowest in his entire playing career in the PBA. Ricardo Brown scored only nine points but his two crucial free throws off the sixth foul of Ramon Fernandez iced the game for the Beermen. On Purefoods' side, it was Al Solis who shone bright and emerged as his team's best local scorer with an average of 16.1 points in that seven-game stretch, Solis topscored for the Hotdogs in the seventh game with 23 points, shooting an amazing 71 percent from the three-point range on five-of-seven shooting.

Rosters

Occurrences
Just before Game 7, PBA Commissioner Rudy Salud summoned Ramon Fernandez and Abet Guidaben for separate offenses in Games 5 and 6, Fernandez was taken to task for not just blaming the referees but accusing them of favoring Purefoods' opponent- San Miguel Beer, while Guidaben was summoned for his reaction at the endgame elbow thrown at him by Fernandez in Game 6 but also his behavior in Game 5. both were fined by the Commissioner's Office.

Broadcast notes

References

1988
1988 PBA season
San Miguel Beermen games
Magnolia Hotshots games
PBA Open Conference Finals
PBA Open Conference Finals